This is a list of members of the Walloon Parliament during the 2009–2014 legislative session, arranged alphabetically.

Composition

2009–2012

2012–

Bureau

Presidents

List of members (75)
← denotes replaced member serving as federal/regional/community minister or federal representative

Notes

Sources
 
 

List of Members of the Walloon Parliament
Walloon Parliament
2009 in Belgium
2010s in Belgium